Frederick James Alexander Murray (5 September 1907 – 6 May 1954) was a Surinamese politician of the NPS. 

Murray was born in Waterloo, Nickerie District. At the age of 17, he started work as an assistant teacher. Later he became a qualified teacher after which he studied in Europe. Upon return in Suriname, he worked as a teacher. At the 1951 Surinamese general election he was elected for the Marowijne District as a member of the Estates of Suriname. Murray died in 1954 at the age of 46.

References 
 

People from Nickerie District
Members of the National Assembly (Suriname)
National Party of Suriname politicians
1907 births
1954 deaths